Planck was a space observatory operated by the European Space Agency (ESA) from 2009 to 2013, which mapped the anisotropies of the cosmic microwave background (CMB) at microwave and infrared frequencies, with high sensitivity and small angular resolution.  The mission substantially improved upon observations made by the NASA Wilkinson Microwave Anisotropy Probe (WMAP).  Planck provided a major source of information relevant to several cosmological and astrophysical issues, such as testing theories of the early Universe and the origin of cosmic structure. Since the end of its mission, Planck has defined the most precise measurements of several key cosmological parameters, including the average density of ordinary matter and dark matter in the Universe and the age of the universe.

The project was started around 1996 and was initially called COBRAS/SAMBA: the Cosmic Background Radiation Anisotropy Satellite/Satellite for Measurement of Background Anisotropies. It was later renamed in honour of the German physicist Max Planck (1858–1947), who became the originator of quantum theory by deriving the formula for black-body radiation.

Built at the Cannes Mandelieu Space Center by Thales Alenia Space, and created as a medium-sized mission for ESA's Horizon 2000 long-term scientific programme, Planck was launched in May 2009. It reached the Earth/Sun  by July 2009, and by February 2010 it had successfully started a second all-sky survey.  On 21 March 2013, the mission's first all-sky map of the cosmic microwave background was released with an additional expanded release including polarization data in February 2015. The final papers by the Planck team were released in July 2018.

At the end of its mission Planck was put into a heliocentric graveyard orbit and passivated to prevent it from endangering any future missions. The final deactivation command was sent to Planck in October 2013.

Objectives 

The mission had a wide variety of scientific aims, including:

 high resolution detections of both the total intensity and polarization of primordial CMB anisotropies,
 creation of a catalogue of galaxy clusters through the Sunyaev–Zel'dovich effect,
 observations of the gravitational lensing of the CMB, as well as the integrated Sachs–Wolfe effect,
 observations of bright extragalactic radio (active galactic nuclei) and infrared (dusty galaxy) sources,
 observations of the Milky Way, including the interstellar medium, distributed synchrotron emission and measurements of the Galactic magnetic field, and
 studies of the Solar System, including planets, asteroids, comets and the zodiacal light.

Planck had a higher resolution and sensitivity than WMAP, allowing it to probe the power spectrum of the CMB to much smaller scales (×3).  It also observed in nine frequency bands rather than WMAP's five, with the goal of improving the astrophysical foreground models.

It is expected that most Planck measurements have been limited by how well foregrounds can be subtracted, rather than by the detector performance or length of the mission, a particularly important factor for the polarization measurements.  The dominant foreground radiation depends on frequency, but could include synchrotron radiation from the Milky Way at low frequencies, and dust at high frequencies.

Instruments 

The spacecraft carries two instruments: the Low Frequency Instrument (LFI) and the High Frequency Instrument (HFI). Both instruments can detect both the total intensity and polarization of photons, and together cover a frequency range of nearly 830 GHz (from 30 to 857 GHz).  The cosmic microwave background spectrum peaks at a frequency of 160.2 GHz.

From August 2009, Planck was the coldest known object in space, until its active coolant supply was exhausted in January 2012.

NASA played a role in the development of this mission and contributes to the analysis of scientific data.  Its Jet Propulsion Laboratory built components of the science instruments, including bolometers for the high-frequency instrument, a 20-kelvin cryocooler for both the low- and high-frequency instruments, and amplifier technology for the low-frequency instrument.

Low Frequency Instrument 

The LFI has three frequency bands, covering the range of 30–70 GHz, covering the microwave to infrared regions of the electromagnetic spectrum. The detectors use high-electron-mobility transistors.

High Frequency Instrument 

The HFI was sensitive between 100 and 857 GHz, using 52 bolometric detectors, manufactured by JPL/Caltech, optically coupled to the telescope through cold optics, manufactured by Cardiff University's School of Physics and Astronomy, consisting of a triple horn configuration and optical filters, a similar concept to that used in the Archeops balloon-borne experiment. These detection assemblies are divided into 6 frequency bands (centred at 100, 143, 217, 353, 545 and 857 GHz), each with a bandwidth of 33%.  Of these six bands, only the lower four have the capability to measure the polarisation of incoming radiation; the two higher bands do not.

On 13 January 2012, it was reported that the on-board supply of helium-3 used in Planck dilution refrigerator had been exhausted, and that the HFI would become unusable within a few days. By this date, Planck had completed five full scans of the CMB, exceeding its target of two.  The LFI (cooled by helium-4) was expected to remain operational for another six to nine months.

Service module 

A common service module (SVM) was designed and built by Thales Alenia Space in its Turin plant, for both the Herschel Space Observatory and Planck missions, combined into one single program.

Both figures include their mission's spacecraft and payload, (shared) launch and mission expenses, and science operations.

Structurally, the Herschel and Planck SVMs are very similar.  Both SVMs are octagonal in shape and each panel is dedicated to accommodate a designated set of warm units, while taking into account the dissipation requirements of the different warm units, of the instruments, as well as the spacecraft.  On both spacecraft, a common design was used for the avionics, attitude control and measurement (ACMS), command and data management (CDMS), power, and tracking, telemetry and command (TT&C) subsystems.  All units on the SVM are redundant.

Power Subsystem 

On each spacecraft, the power subsystem consists of a solar array, employing triple-junction solar cells, a battery and the power control unit (PCU).  The PCU is designed to interface with the 30 sections of each solar array, to provide a regulated 28 volt bus, to distribute this power via protected outputs, and to handle the battery charging and discharging.

For Planck, the circular solar array is fixed on the bottom of the satellite, always facing the Sun as the satellite rotates on its vertical axis.

Attitude and Orbit Control 

This function is performed by the attitude control computer (ACC), which is the platform for the attitude control and measurement subsystem (ACMS).  It was designed to fulfil the pointing and slewing requirements of the Herschel and Planck payloads.

The Planck satellite rotates at one revolution per minute, with an aim of an absolute pointing error less than 37 arc-minutes.  As Planck is also a survey platform, there is the additional requirement for pointing reproducibility error less than 2.5 arc-minutes over 20 days.

The main line-of-sight sensor in both Herschel and Planck is the star tracker.

Launch and orbit 

The satellite was successfully launched, along with the Herschel Space Observatory, at 13:12:02 UTC on 14 May 2009 aboard an Ariane 5 ECA heavy launch vehicle from the Guiana Space Centre.  The launch placed the craft into a very elliptical orbit (perigee: , apogee: more than ), bringing it near the  Lagrangian point of the Earth-Sun system,  from the Earth.

The temperature of the High Frequency Instrument reached just a tenth of a degree above absolute zero (0.1 K) on 3 July 2009, placing both the Low Frequency and High Frequency Instruments within their cryogenic operational parameters, making Planck fully operational.

Decommissioning 

In January 2012 the HFI exhausted its supply of liquid helium, causing the detector temperature to rise and rendering the HFI unusable. The LFI continued to be used until science operations ended on 3 October 2013. The spacecraft performed a manoeuvre on 9 October to move it away from Earth and its , placing it into a heliocentric orbit, while payload deactivation occurred on 19 October. Planck was commanded on 21 October to exhaust its remaining fuel supply; passivation activities were conducted later, including battery disconnection and the disabling of protection mechanisms. The final deactivation command, which switched off the spacecraft's transmitter, was sent to Planck on 23 October 2013 at 12:10:27 UTC.

Results 

Planck started its First All-Sky Survey on 13 August 2009. In September 2009, the European Space Agency announced the preliminary results from the Planck First Light Survey, which was performed to demonstrate the stability of the instruments and the ability to calibrate them over long periods. The results indicated that the data quality is excellent.

On 15 January 2010 the mission was extended by 12 months, with observation continuing until at least the end of 2011. After the successful conclusion of the First Survey, the spacecraft started its Second All Sky Survey on 14 February 2010, with more than 95% of the sky observed already and 100% sky coverage being expected by mid-June 2010.

Some planned pointing list data from 2009 have been released publicly, along with a video visualization of the surveyed sky.

On 17 March 2010, the first Planck photos were published, showing dust concentration within 500 light years from the Sun.

On 5 July 2010, the Planck mission delivered its first all-sky image.

The first public scientific result of Planck is the Early-Release Compact-Source Catalogue, released during the January 2011 Planck conference in Paris.

On 5 May 2014 a map of the galaxy's magnetic field created using Planck was published.

The Planck team and principal investigators Nazzareno Mandolesi and Jean-Loup Puget shared the 2018 Gruber Prize in Cosmology. Puget was also awarded the 2018 Shaw Prize in Astronomy.

2013 data release 
On 21 March 2013, the European-led research team behind the Planck cosmology probe released the mission's all-sky map of the cosmic microwave background. This map suggests the Universe is slightly older than thought: according to the map, subtle fluctuations in temperature were imprinted on the deep sky when the Universe was about 370,000 years old. The imprint reflects ripples that arose as early in the existence of the Universe as the first nonillionth (10−30) of a second. It is theorised that these ripples gave rise to the present vast cosmic web of galactic clusters and dark matter. According to the team, the Universe is  billion-years-old, and contains  ordinary matter,  dark matter and  dark energy. The Hubble constant was also measured to be .

2015 data release 
Results from an analysis of Planck full mission were made public on 1 December 2014 at a conference in Ferrara, Italy. A full set of papers detailing the mission results were released in February 2015. Some of the results include:

 More agreement with previous WMAP results on parameters such as the density and distribution of matter in the Universe, as well as more accurate results with less margin of error.
 Confirmation of the Universe having a 26% content of dark matter. These results also raise related questions about the positron excess over electrons detected by the Alpha Magnetic Spectrometer, an experiment on the International Space Station. Previous research suggested that positrons could be created by the collision of dark matter particles, which could only occur if the probability of dark matter collisions is significantly higher now than in the early Universe. Planck data suggests that the probability of such collisions must remain constant over time to account for the structure of the Universe, negating the previous theory.
 Validation of the simplest models of inflation, thus giving the Lambda-CDM model stronger support.
 That there are likely only three types of neutrinos, with a fourth proposed sterile neutrino unlikely to exist.

Project scientists worked too with BICEP2 scientists to release joint research in 2015 answering whether a signal detected by BICEP2 was evidence of primordial gravitational waves, or was simple background noise from dust in the Milky Way galaxy. Their results suggest the latter.

2018 final data release

See also 

 DustPedia
 Lambda-CDM model
 List of cosmological computation software
 Observational cosmology
 Physical cosmology
Terahertz radiation

References

Further reading

External links 

 ESA
 Planck mission website
 Planck science website
 Planck operations website
 Planck science results website
 NASA
 Planck mission website
 NASA/IPAC Planck archive

European Space Agency space probes
Cosmic microwave background experiments
Space telescopes
Infrared telescopes
Submillimetre telescopes
Derelict satellites in heliocentric orbit
Spacecraft using Lissajous orbits
Space probes launched in 2009
2013 disestablishments
Lists of things named after physicists